The Sikh diaspora is the modern Sikh migration from the traditional area of the Punjab region of India. Sikhism is  a religion, the Punjab region of India being the historic homeland of Sikhism. The Sikh diaspora is largely a subset of the Punjabi diaspora.

The starting point of the diaspora is commonly accepted to have begun after the fall of the Sikh Empire in 1849 and the Empire's subsequent annexation into the British India.  The most famous personification of the Sikh diaspora was the first, Maharajah Duleep Singh, the last Emperor of the Sikhs who was coerced into a lifetime exile by the British Raj.  Since Duleep Singh's exile, the rate of Sikh migration from Punjab has remained high; however, the destination for Punjabi Sikh migrants has changed during the ensuing 150 years. The development of the Punjabi Sikh diaspora concept has given diaspora Sikhs a conscious political and cultural identity, which forms a reference point for their 'Sikhism'.

Religion
With more than 25 million worldwide, Sikhs are adherents to the fifth-largest religion in the world, Sikhism, making up 0.39% of the world population.  The 2011 Indian census reported approximately 20 million Sikhs living in India. Of these, 16 million, or 76% of all Indian Sikhs, live in the northern state of Punjab, where they form 58% of the population.  Substantial communities of Sikhs, more than 200,000, lived in the Indian states and union territories of Haryana, Rajasthan, Uttar Pradesh, Delhi, Himachal Pradesh, Maharashtra, Uttarakhand and Jammu and Kashmir as of 2011. Significant Sikh population also live in the states of Maharastra and Bihar which are home to the two important Sikh Takht of Hazur Sahib and Patna Sahib respectively. The Canadian province of British Columbia is also home to close to  300,000 Sikhs.

Historical migration patterns

The Sikhs as a political entity, distinct from other Indian traditions, can be said to have begun with the martyrdom of the fifth Sikh Guru, Guru Arjan Dev Ji in 1606, Sikh distinction was further enhanced by the establishment of the Sikh 'Pure' brotherhood or Khalsa (ਖ਼ਾਲਸਾ), by Guru Gobind Singh Ji in 1699. This gives the Sikhs, as an organized political grouping, a relatively recent history of around 400 years.  Migrations of Sikhs during the era of the Gurus were limited to the boundaries of modern-day India and Pakistan, and in particular, restricted to the Sikh tribal heartland of the Punjab Region.The development of the Sikh Confederacy and the development of the Sikh Empire (1716–1849), led to Sikhs migrating to conquered parts of their empire such as Ladakh and Peshawar. However, these migrations were limited, transitory, and unsustained, depending on the Empire's fluctuating boundaries.  During the time of the Sikh Empire, there was a net cultural immigration, with Napoleonic and British influences vying for the 'ear' of the then Sikh Maharajah Ranjit Singh. With respect to the Sikh diaspora, the most important political aspect of this period was the historical establishment of a Sikh homeland; the idea of a powerful Sikh state was a reality.

Annexation of the Punjab

Sikh migration from Punjab began in earnest in the second half of the 19th century when the British Raj had successfully completed its annexation of the Punjab.  The pivotal action in the British annexation was the lifetime exile of the then eleven-year-old Maharaja, Duleep Singh, thus making Singh the first (although unwilling) member of the Sikh diaspora.

Although a largely secular figure who did little for the Sikh body politic, Axel (2001) argues that Duleep Singh's exile has had a major impact on the Sikh diaspora psyche.  Axel(2001) says that Duleep Singh is the archetypal 'tragic hero' figure in Sikh culture, "a King without a Kingdom, a Sikh separated from his people"; the contrast between Duleep Singh and his strong ruler father, Maharaja Ranjit Singh Ji. 

Having annexed the Sikh Kingdom, the British Raj preferentially recruited Sikhs in the Indian Civil Service and, in particular, the British Indian Army, which led to the migration of Sikhs to different parts of British India and the British Empire. Semiskilled artisans were transported from the Punjab to British East Africa to help in the building of railways, while many Sikhs found themselves in Australia working as Ghans, or cameleers and as labourers on cane plantations.

20th century
The Sikhs made tremendous contributions to Punjab from 1857 to 1947. Sikhs founded the city of Rawalpindi. Sikh agricultural and entrepreneurial skills brought prosperity to Sheikhupura, Sialkot, Jhelum, Multan, Sargodha, Gujrat, Ludhiana, Amritsar, Jullundar. Lahore, the capital of undivided Punjab, had thriving Sikh neighborhoods.

The era of peace and prosperity turned into a nightmare in 1947. The partition of Punjab between India and Pakistan was a seminal tragedy for Sikhs. The Sikh communities were practically wiped out from Lahore, Rawalpindi, Multan, Sialkot, Lyallpur, Jhelum, Gujrat, Sargodha, Sheikhupura and other districts of West Punjab. The birthplace of Sikhism, Nankana Sahib, was split away in West Punjab. Millions of Sikhs fled to freedom and safety in East Punjab in India. Such intense violence in East Punjab had caused many villages and cities to go through reconstruction. Smaller numbers also fled to Afghanistan.

In 1960s and beyond many Sikhs migrated to the UK and North America in search of economic opportunities. Some of the Sikhs who had settled in eastern Africa were expelled by Ugandan leader Idi Amin in 1972. Sikhs are primarily an agrarian community and with the pressures of having only a limited amount of land, high birth rates and the desire to make a better living, the male offspring of Sikh farmers were encouraged to migrate to foreign countries.  Subsequently, the main 'push' factor for Sikh migration has been economic with significant Sikh communities now being found in Philippines, Canada, the United Kingdom, the United States, Malaysia, East Africa, Australia and Thailand.

Khalistan movement

Axel (2001) argues that the Sikh diaspora community, having established themselves in foreign countries, begin to fetishize the past and nurture idealized designs for their 'lost and imaginary' Sikh empire.  This comes into fruition to a certain degree with the establishment of Indian Punjab in 1966 as a Sikh majority state.  However, Tatla(1998) argues that the marginalization and sense of grievance that Indian Sikhs were facing due to Indira Gandhi's heavy-handed tactics were amplified in the Sikh diaspora.  Subsequently, the Sikh diaspora, especially in South Vancouver, Canada and the UK become willing suppliers of logistical and financial support when the organic agitation for a separate Sikh nation, Khalistan, began in the late 1970s.  The actions taken by the Indian government to counter the Sikh separatist movement, via 1984's Operation Blue Star, had a seismic effect on the Sikh diaspora.  Axel (2001) argues that the desecration of the Sikh's holiest shrine, Harimandir Sahib, and the following Sikh pogrom in which thousands of Sikhs were massacred; led to a resurgence in Sikh religiosity and a strengthening of ties with their Sikh brethren in Punjab.  Diaspora Sikhs felt betrayed by India, and the events of 1984 defined their Sikhism and underlined a distinct commonality shared with other diaspora Sikhs.  Mark Tully describes 1984's Operation Blue Star as the Sikh's '9/11', this was certainly the case for diaspora Sikhs, who in the main could only watch on in horror as the events of 1984 played out on TV.

In 1971 Dr Jagit Singh Chohan, an ex-minister in a short-lived government of Akali dissidents, saw an alignment of like-minded Sikhs.  Chohan placed a half-page advertisement in The New York Times of 12 October 1971, making several claims about Punjab as a Sikh homeland.  However, Chohan won little sympathy from ordinary Sikhs

Tatla summarises the change in Sikh diaspora community leaders post 1984 a being a "painful transition from a self-confident community with haughty discourse, to the self-defensive strategies of a vulnerable minority". Organisations such as the International Sikh Youth Federation (ISYF), the Babbar Khalsa and the Council of Khalistan emerged within the diaspora, and these agencies rallied against "Hindu imperialism" or "Indian nationalism" and lobbied to join the Unrepresented Nations and Peoples Organization UNPO aligning the Sikh cause with other ethnic groups seeking freedom, citing cases of Jews, Palestinians, Kurds, Balochis, Kashmiris and Sri Lankan Tamils. Another organization by the name of Sikhs for Justice, headquartered in New York, which surfaced roughly in 2014, has now self appointed it as the leader for the separatist movement, and is campaigning for the cause using activities like #BurnTheTricolour.

Axel (2001) argues that the history of the Sikh diaspora, its psyche of grievance and the violence inflicted on it, means that the notion of the Sikh diaspora as a community today inevitably converges on the notion of Khalistan.  In addition to this, Axel points out the 'nightmare' scenario facing the Sikh diaspora; the Indian state 'demands' the 'Unity-in-Diversity' model of 'rashtriya ekta' (national integration) which Axel contends is signified by "the denial of difference through surrender, assimilation and integration". Since the formation of the Khalsa, the Sikhs have defined themselves though their 'separateness' and have differentiated themselves philosophically and physically from other Indian religious communities, thus the process of 'rashtriya ekta' is a threat to Sikhi itself.  Any 'weakening' or 'dilution' Sikhi in the Punjab, is doubly painful for the Sikh diaspora for it means a corresponding weakness in Khalistan, which, both real and imaginary, epitomizes the Sikh diasporic place today.

Sikh identity today

Whilst the rate of Sikh migration from the Punjab, India has remained high, traditional patterns of Sikh migration that favored English speaking countries, particularly the United Kingdom, has changed in the past decade due to factors such as stricter immigration procedures.  Moliner(2006) states that as a consequence of the 'fact' that Sikh migration to the UK had "become virtually impossible since the late 1970s", Sikh migration patterns altered to continental Europe.  Italy has now emerged as a fast-growing area for Sikh migration, with Reggio Emilia and the Vicenza province being areas of significant Sikh population clusters. The Italian Sikhs are generally involved in the areas of agriculture, agro-processing, machine tools and horticulture. Canada has maintained a liberal immigration policy, and the Sikh community there is the largest in proportion to the country's population even above India (2.1% of Canada's population versus 1.7% of India's). The largest North American Sikh community is thought to be located in South Vancouver, British Columbia and nearby Surrey, British Columbia, while Brampton, Ontario also has a large Sikh population.  The Sikh migration to Australasia has also increased to a large extent in the first decade of the 21st century.

In the post-9/11 era, the Sikh diaspora in Europe and North America stand out as a visible minority often confused with radical Islamic groups because of their turbans. There have been numerous hate crimes targeted at Sikhs. France banned turban-wearing Sikh students from publicly funded schools as part of a broader policy originally intended to restrict Muslim head-scarves. Western security think-tanks quote the Air India bombing to justify profiling of Sikh travellers at airports. Countering this train of thought, on 16 January 2018, Gurbir Grewal became attorney general of New Jersey - the first practicing Sikh in the US to become a State Attorney General. The soft influences of popular culture and the need for fitting in with peers are driving many young Sikhs to shed Khalsa symbols such as the turban and beard. Some second-generation Sikhs growing up in the West do not have proficiency in the Punjabi language. On the other hand, small groups of Westerners have converted to Sikhism. There are now Sikh Gurduwaras (equivalent of churches and temples) scattered across Europe, North America, Australia and Malaysia. The combination of these factors creates a new and more complex Sikh identity that may slowly emerge in the 21st century.

See also
Sikhism by country

References

Further reading
 The Sikh Diaspora Search for Statehood by Darshan Singh Tatla (1998) University of Washington Press. 
 Contesting Khalistan the Sikh diaspora and the politics of separatism /Gunawardena, Therese Suhashini. Jan 2001 Thesis (PhD).  Pub. by University of Texas at Austin, 2001. Available at: http://repositories.lib.utexas.edu/handle/2152/6181
 Twice Versus Direct Migrants: East African Sikh Settlers in Britain by Parminder Bhachu. Pub. by Clark University (7 April 1990).
 Relational Embodiments of a Sikh Diaspora by Anjali Gera Roy Pub. by Indian Institute of Technology, Kharagpur, India (2001).  Available on https://web.archive.org/web/20070701185828/http://social.chass.ncsu.edu/jouvert/v7is1/gera.htm.
 Sikhs at Large: Religion, Culture, and Politics in Global Perspective by Verne A. Dusenbery (2008) Oxford University Press. ; 
 Sikh Diaspora Philanthropy in Punjab: Global Giving for Local Good by Verne A. Dusenbery and Darshan S. Tatla, eds. (2009) Oxford University Press.  ; 
 Sikhs in Latin America: Travels Among the Sikh Diaspora by Swarn Singh Kahlon (2012) Manohar Publishers and Distributors, New Delhi, India.

External links
 Indian Diaspora, Official Government of India Website
 Sikh NRI Online, Info pertaining to Sikh NRIs Worldwide
 History of Sikh Diaspora in Canada and USA
Sikh Global Village - Latin America

Indian diaspora by ethnic group
Diaspora
 Diaspora